Jotunheimen ("the home of the Jötunn") is a mountainous area of roughly  in southern Norway and is part of the long range known as the Scandinavian Mountains. The Jotunheimen mountains straddle the border between Innlandet and Vestland counties (historically part of the old Oppland and Sogn og Fjordane counties).

Tourism
Jotunheimen is very popular with hikers and climbers, and the Norwegian Mountain Touring Association maintains a number of mountain lodges in the area, as well as marked trails that run between the lodges and others that run up to some of the peaks. The area has more than 50 marked trails, ranging from shorter hikes to multi day trails. 

The image from Gjende shows a cliff trailing down into the lake. At its base there is a popular guest house called Memurubu. The picture is taken from Gjendesheim, a starting point for hiking into the mountain range. There is a very popular trail along Besseggen that follows the edge of the mountainous range to the right, which it is named after.

There is a National Tourist Route, the Sognefjell Road, from Skjolden to Lom and another road, the RV 51, from Gol to Vågå through the special area of Valdresflya.

Etymology
Originally there was no common name for this large mountainous area.  However, in 1820, the Norwegian geologist and mountaineer, Baltazar Mathias Keilhau  proposed the name Jotunfjeldene "the mountains of the Jotnar" (inspired by the German name Riesengebirge). This was later changed to Jotunheimen by the poet Aasmund Olavsson Vinje in 1862 – this name/form was directly inspired by the name Jötunheimr in Norse mythology.

Geology

Jotunheimen is a residual mountain, which is a mass of rock that has remained in place as the surrounding relief has been eroded. The tops of Dovrefjell and Jotunheimen and other parts of southern Norway are the few remnants of a formerly flat surface that existed in Norway prior to uplift. This surface is now largely eroded and warped. The said erosion formed a series of steps and it is from the highest of these steps that Jotunheimen rise.

Jotunheimen National Park 
The Hurrungane mountain range is also inside the national park with the sharpest peaks in Jotunheimen. Adjacent to the national park border is Utladalen Nature Reserve which covers the Utladalen valley and the mountain Falketind, amongst others.

Human presence
The Jotunheimen shoe was discovered in August 2006. Archaeologists estimate that the leather shoe was made between 1800 and 1100 BC, making it the oldest article of clothing discovered in Scandinavia. It was discovered along with several arrows and a wooden spade, leading archaeologists to conclude that they had unearthed an important hunting ground.

In February 2020, Secrets of the Ice Program researchers discovered a 1,500-year-old Viking arrowhead dating back to the Germanic Iron age and locked in a glacier in southern Norway caused by the climate change in the Jotunheimen Mountains.

Traffic
Despite the large area of Jotunheimen, there are few roads for car traffic. Between Jotunheimen and Breheimen, the plateau is crossed by the Norwegian County Road 55. To the west, the road continues further from Skjolden via Sogndalsfjøra, Balestrand and Høyanger to the European route E39. In the east, the road leads to Lom. A few small dirt roads lead to different parts of the edge of Jotunheimen National Park, although the area of the national park itself is practically roadless. A small exception, however, is a blind road in the Veodalen to Glitterheim, whose head is inside the national park area near the Glittertind.

See also
Bjørn G. Andersen
Eidsbugarden
Jens Esmark
Jotunheimvegen
Prinsehytta
Tourism in Norway
Vestre Hestlægerhøe

References

External links 

 Jotunheimen website
 Tilltopps - Hiking in Jotunheimen.
 Photos of Jotunheimen
 UT: Hiking trails in Jotunheimen
 Jotunheimen Travel: Multi-day tours in Jotunheimen
 Sognefjell Road
 Jotunheimen in pictures
 The Jotunheimen Mountains - the official travel guide to Norway

 
Mountain ranges of Norway
Landforms of Innlandet
Landforms of Vestland